Darantoides is a genus of moths in the family Erebidae. The genus was erected by George Hampson in 1900.

Species
 Darantoides rubroflava Hampson, 1900

Former species
 Darantoides lineolata Hulstaert, 1924
 Darantoides plagiata Hulstaert, 1924

References

External links

Nudariina
Moth genera